Ann Freedman (née Fertig, born ) is an American art dealer and gallery owner. She was previously director of the now-defunct Knoedler Gallery in New York City; she resigned in 2009 after 31 years working for the gallery during a large-scale forgery scandal. Referred to as a "leading New York gallerist" by the New York Times, she was prominently featured in the Netflix documentary Made You Look: A True Story About Fake Art by documentary filmmaker Barry Avrich. In 2011, Freedman opened her own gallery called FreedmanArt in Manhattan's Upper East Side.

Biography and career
Ann Louise Fertig was born circa 1949 to Hilda and Felix C. Fertig, a real-estate executive from Scarsdale, New York. She attended Green Acres Elementery School, and later graduated from Scarsdale High School. She attended university at Washington University in St. Louis as a painting major, earning a BFA in 1971. She first got a job at the gallery of André Emmerich working as a receptionist before starting at Knoedler as a salesperson in 1977. Freedman eventually became director and was referred to by author Anthony M. Amore as "the famous face of Knoedler". When many works Freedman had acquired for the gallery turned out to be forgeries, Freedman was removed from her post and eventually resigned in 2009. A lawsuit against Freedman filed by Italian businessman Domenico De Sole and his wife Eleanore for selling them a fake Rothko for $8.3 million was settled in 2016. Freedman participated in the documentary Made You Look about the experience in 2020. Hyperallergic writer Hrag Vartanian stated Freedman came across "like an art world caricature" in the film. 

After leaving Knoedler, Freedman decided to open her own studio in the Upper East Side called FreedmanArt. The first show, titled "Embracing Circles: 1959–1960", featured work by Jules Olitski. She represents American painter Frank Stella.

Personal life
Freedman became engaged to Robert Lawrence Freedman, son of Herbert J. Freedman, in 1972. Their engagement was announced by The New York Times in October of that year. They married December 24, 1972. 

Freedman's mother Hilda died in November 1997. Her father Felix died on April 21, 2002.

Filmography

References

External links 
 

American art dealers
People from Manhattan
Year of birth missing (living people)
Living people
Washington University in St. Louis alumni
Sam Fox School of Design & Visual Arts alumni